Irving Shipbuilding Inc. is a Canadian shipbuilder and in-service support provider. 
The company owns industrial fabricators Woodside Industries in Dartmouth, Marine Fabricators in Dartmouth, Halifax Shipyard as the largest facility 
and company head office as well as Halifax-based Fleetway Inc., an engineering and design, support and project management firm.

Irving Shipbuilding Inc. was incorporated in 1959 and is headquartered in Halifax, Nova Scotia, Canada. The company operates as a subsidiary of J.D. Irving Limited.

History

Foundation
The company's history began in 1959,  when K.C. Irving purchased Saint John Shipbuilding which was renamed Irving Shipbuilding.

20th-century developments

In 1994, Irving Shipbuilding bought the Halifax-Dartmouth Industries Limited in Halifax, Nova Scotia, creating Canada's largest shipbuilding company. Later, the management renamed the yard to Halifax Shipyard Limited. At the same time the company acquired the East Isle Shipyard, a facility on Prince Edward Island that built modules for frigates.

Subsequently, Irving Shipbuilding purchased the Shelburne Ship Repair shipyard in Shelburne to support the Halifax-class project. The company also had a lease agreement on the Pictou Shipyard which has been dormant since the summer of 2004. Later the Pictou Shipyard was purchased in 2008 by Aecon Atlantic Industrial Inc., a member of Aecon Group Inc.

In 1997, Saint John Naval Systems acquired and merged with Fleetway Consulting Services Inc. in Ottawa, Ontario, forming a new company—Fleetway Inc, after Irving bought that company.

21st-century developments
On 27 June 2003, Irving Shipbuilding announced that it had signed an agreement with the federal government for $55 million in economic readjustment funding provided that Saint John Shipbuilding be closed permanently.

In 2008 Irving Shipbuilding was awarded a $549M contract to modernize seven of Canada's fleet of Halifax-class frigates. In 2016, the final frigate, HMCS Toronto, completed modernization at the Halifax Shipyard.

In September 2009, the Minister of Fisheries and Oceans and Minister of National Defence announced that nine mid shore patrol vessels were being ordered from Irving Shipbuilding to be constructed at Halifax Shipyard in Halifax, Nova Scotia for a cost of $194 million.

In January 2010, ownership of Shelburne Ship Repair was transferred to Irving Shipbuilding in an agreement under the province's Industrial Expansion Fund whereby Nova Scotia would provide an $8.8-million loan for the yard's upgrades. Irving Shipbuilding operated the Shelburne Ship Repair for 13 years under lease.

Later, in 2010, Irving Shipbuilding invested $16.6 million in upgrades of Shelburne Ship Repair, to modernize the yard's cradle and marine railway, as well as the wharf. The upgrade was completed between April 2010 and Aug 2011 and included removing the old cradle and marine railway and designing and building new ones to accommodate two larger vessels simultaneously.  It also included dredging and reconstructing the wharf, general paving and repairs, fencing and shop and office repairs.

In 2011, the historic National Shipbuilding Procurement Strategy (NSPS) was undertaken by the Canadian Government, seeking to identify two shipbuilding "Centres of Excellence" for the country for the next 30 years. Irving Shipbuilding was selected by the Canadian Government to build the Royal Canadian Navy's new combat fleet, a program that comprises 21 vessels and $25 billion over a period of 30 years.

In 2013 Irving Shipbuilding has started its $300-million modernization of the Halifax Shipyard to accommodate the building of vessels for the federal government.

On August 6, 2013 Kevin M. McCoy joined the company as a President of Irving Shipbuilding Inc.

In January, 2015 Irving Shipbuilding and the federal government have signed a contract to build six Arctic offshore patrol ships and the deal guarantees the Halifax yard five ships with a ceiling of $2.3 billion.

On October, 2016 Irving Shipbuilding Inc. and the Nunavut Research Institute (NRI) awarded $2 million in funding to nine applied Arctic research projects.

On March, 2017 Irving Shipbuilding announced it would contribute $4.52 million to the Centre for Ocean Ventures and Entrepreneurship, as part an obligation under the National Shipbuilding Strategy that requires the company to re-invest a portion of its contract revenues.

Facilities

Halifax Shipyard

The Halifax Shipyard is ISI's largest facility and company head office.

In 2009, the Halifax Shipyard employed 470 people.

Woodside Shipyard
The Woodside Shipyard in Dartmouth, Nova Scotia also offers various construction, modification, upgrade and maintenance
services from its deepwater quayside facilities.

The Woodside Shipyard employed 127 (FTE) in 2009.

Fleetway Inc.
ISI also operates a subsidiary company called Fleetway Inc. which provides naval engineering and technical services. The company works with firms in the Canadian defence, oil and gas, shipbuilding and other sectors.

Fleetway employed more than 80 employees in 2009.

Controversies
Irving Shipbuilding as part of J.D. Irving Limited is often criticized by both the local government and the media.

In September 2009, Irving Shipbuilding was awarded a $198 million-contract for built nine mid-shore patrol ships for Canadian Coast Guard. The ships were delivered to the Canadian Coast Guard from 2012 to 2014. In late 2015 and early 2016, various media outlets carried reports about electrical and mechanical problems dogging the 43-metre ships. According to a news report from the Chronicle Herald in December 2015, among the unions concerns were around the issues of: water could flow from compartment to compartment putting the ship at risk; rolling stabilization; the ability to lower lifeboats with crew on board; and major fire protection issues. A report from the CBC said warranty claims by the coast guard include: faulty wiring, polluted water tanks, premature corrosion and gearbox failure. In the summer of 2016, one of the ships had to undergo repairs because of corrosion.

In November 2013, between 200 and 300 workers at the Irving-owned Halifax Shipyard walked off the job complaining of bullying by management. Workers staged a walkout at the Irving-owned Halifax Shipyard to protest against management harassment following the suicide of a shipyard employee who received a 30-day suspension without pay. Later, the president of Irving Shipbuilding, Kevin McCoy said that bullying was not a factor in the shipyard employee's suicide.

References

External links
 

Shipbuilding companies of Canada
Companies based in Halifax, Nova Scotia
Year of establishment missing